George Irving may refer to:

George Irving (American actor) (1874–1961), American film actor and director 
George Irving (English actor) (born 1954), British television actor
George S. Irving (1922–2016), American theatre actor
George Vere Irving (1815–1869), Scottish lawyer and antiquary

See also
George Irvine (disambiguation)
George Irwin (disambiguation)